Cepolidae is a family of air-breathing land snails, terrestrial pulmonate gastropod mollusks in the superfamily Helicoidea (according to the taxonomy of the Gastropoda by Bouchet & Rocroi, 2005).

Distribution 
Distribution of Cepolidae include Nearctic and Caribbean.

Anatomy
This family is defined by the absence of the diverticulum. Snails in this family have one dart apparatus, and one mucous gland on top of the dart sac. The sheath of the dart apparatus has two glands.

Taxonomy
This family is placed within the clade Stylommatophora within the clade Eupulmonata (according to the taxonomy of the Gastropoda by Bouchet & Rocroi, 2005). In many textbooks and on many websites however this family is listed as the subfamily Cepolinae within the family Helminthoglyptidae.

The name Cepolidae Ihering, 1909  is a homonym for the family Cepolidae Rafinesque, 1815 (based on Cepola Linnaeus, 1766) a family of bandfishes in the superfamily Cepoloidea within the order Perciformes. The name of the gastropod family needs be submitted to the International Commission on Zoological Nomenclature to resolve the homonymy.

Genera
Genera within the family Cepolidae include:
 Bellacepolis Baker, 1943
 Cepolis Montfort, 1810 - type genus of the family Cepolidae
 Coryda  Albers, 1850
 Cysticopsis Mörch, 1852
 Dialeuca Albers, 1850
 Euclastaria Pilsbry, 1926
 Eurycampta Von Martens, 1860
 Guladentia Clench y Aguayo, 1951
 Hemitrochus Swainson, 1840
 Jeanneretia L. Pfeiffer, 1877
 Levicepolis Baker, 1943
 Plagioptycha L. Pfeiffer, 1855
 Setipellis Pilsbry, 1926
 Polymita  Beck, 1837

References

External links

 
Taxa named by Hermann von Ihering